The 2010 Country Music Association Awards, 44th Annual Ceremony, is a music award ceremony that was held on November 10, 2010, at the Bridgestone Arena in Nashville, Tennessee and the show was hosted for the third time by Brad Paisley and Carrie Underwood.

Background 
Miranda Lambert was the lead nominee with 9 total. Lambert broke a record for most CMA nominations ever received by a female artist in a single year.

Winners and nominees

Winners are shown in bold.

References 

Country Music Association
CMA
Country Music Association Awards
Country Music Association Awards
November 2010 events in the United States
2010 awards in the United States
21st century in Nashville, Tennessee
Events in Nashville, Tennessee